Ibolya Oláh (born 31 January 1978) is a Hungarian pop singer. She was the runner-up of the first series of Hungarian television singing competition series Megasztár.

Ibolya is of Romani ancestry. She was born in Nyíregyháza and grew up in an orphanage in Tiszadob, where she studied vegetable gardening. She briefly attended a music school in Budapest but did not finish it. She learned to sing and to play the guitar mostly by herself. After a few unsuccessful entries at talent contests, she entered the talent show Megasztár (in its first season during 2003/04) and came second after Vera Tóth. Her debut album, released in 2004, reached No. 1 on the Hungarian album chart and stayed on the chart for 41 weeks. Her second album, released in the following year, was No.2 and her third album No. 4.

Her main influences are Linda Perry, Alanis Morissette, Pink, Ildikó Keresztes, Guns N' Roses, Rolling Stones, Aerosmith, and Queen.

In November 2011 she was outed as a lesbian by the tabloid Blikk.

In 2014, she competed in the Hungarian national final of the Eurovision Song Contest, in A Dal 2014, with her entry "1 percig sztár" (Star for 1 minute) where she advanced through the first heat but was eliminated in the semi-finals.

In October 2018, Ibolya released her new album in collaboration with Gábor Presser. The album has 28 songs, which include originals as well as poetry made into songs. These poems were written by Virág Erdős, Péter Kántor, Lajos Parti Nagy, Zorán Sztevanovity, Dániel Varró, Péter Závada, Szilárd Borbély, Ernő Szép and Endre Fejes. The material of the album will be used in a theatre performance.

Discography

Albums

Singles
 2004 "Nem kell" (#20 on MAHASZ Radio Top 40; No. 21 on MAHASZ Editor's Choice)
 2005 "Magyaroszág" (#2, No. 5, No. 124 on Euro 200)
 2005 "Édes méreg" (#12 on Top 40)
 2006 "Nézz vissza" (#24 on Top 40)
 2006 "Valamit valamiért" feat. Roy & Ádám (#27 on Top 40)
 2008 "Egy elfelejtett dal" feat. Zsuzsa Cserháti & Caramel (#13 on Top 40)
 2010 "Ritmus" (#4 on Top 40)
 2010 "Baby" (#8 on Top 40)
 2013 "Mással csináljuk" (Egy Másik Zenekar feat. Oláh Ibolya)
 2018 "Voltam Ibojka"

See also
Hungarian pop

Sources

External links

Ibolya Oláh Museum
Ibolya Oláh Fan Site

1978 births
Living people
People from Nyíregyháza
Hungarian Romani people
21st-century Hungarian women singers
Romani musicians
LGBT Romani people
Lesbian singers
Hungarian LGBT singers
Idols (franchise) participants
Hungarian lesbian musicians
20th-century Hungarian LGBT people
21st-century Hungarian LGBT people